Observatory Hill, formerly known as Elgin Hill, is a hill where the Hong Kong Observatory is sited. Observatory Road is a road passing through Royal Observatory Hong Kong from east to west. Both its south slope Knutsford Terrace and north slope Hillwood Road are full of restaurants, pubs and bars.

Mountains, peaks and hills of Hong Kong
Tsim Sha Tsui